Lena Headey is an English actress and producer. Headey studied acting at Shelley College where she performed in a number of school productions at the Royal National Theatre. She made her film debut in the 1992 mystery drama Waterland. After appearing in a series of supporting parts throughout the 1990s, she went on to find fame for lead performances in big-budget films such as the fantasy film The Brothers Grimm (2005) and the action film 300 (2007), portraying Gorgo, Queen of Sparta, a role she yet again played in 300: Rise of an Empire (2014).

She gained international recognition in 2011 with the HBO fantasy drama series Game of Thrones for her portrayal of Cersei Lannister. As of 2016, Headey has received consecutive Primetime Emmy nominations from 2014 to 2016 and 2018 to 2019, and one Golden Globe Award nomination. In 2017, Headey became one of the highest paid actors on television and earned £2 million per episode of Game of Thrones.

Headey played the villain Ma-Ma in the science fiction action film Dredd (2012). The following year she appeared in the horror film The Purge (2013). She then starred in the historical comedy horror Pride and Prejudice and Zombies (2016).

Film

Television

Music videos

Video games

References

External links
 

Actress filmographies
American filmographies
British filmographies